Vettor Pisani (132413 August 1380) was a Venetian admiral. He was in command of the Venetian fleet in 1378 during the war against the Genoese, whom he defeated off Capo d'Anzio; subsequently he recaptured Cattaro, Sebenico and Arbe, which had been seized by the Hungarians, the allies of the Genoese. But the Genoese fleet completely defeated Pisani at Pola in May 1379, and on his return to Venice he was thrown into prison.
The Genoese then pressed home their victory, and besieged and captured Chioggia, whereby Venice itself was in danger. The people thereupon demanded the liberation of Pisani, in whose skill they had the fullest confidence.

The government gave way and appointed the aged commander admiral of the fleet once more. Through his able strategy and daring he recaptured Chioggia, defeated the Genoese and threatened Genoa itself until that republic agreed to peace terms.

Pisani died in 1380 while on his way to Manfredonia with a squadron to ship provisions. He is buried in Basilica of San Giovanni e Paolo, Venice.

Several ships have borne his name, including Vettor Pisani, an armored cruiser built in the 1890s and the submarine Vettor Pisani, which operated during World War II.

His statue is No.14 on Prato della valle Padua. The home of Vettor Pisani is supposed to be the building in which now is the Hotel Saturnia.

References

 Vittorio Lazzarini, La morte e il monumento di Vettor Pisani, in the Nuovo archivio veneto, vol., xi., pt. ii. (1896).

External links

1324 births
1380 deaths
Republic of Venice admirals
14th-century Venetian people
People from Manfredonia
Medieval admirals
People of the War of Chioggia
Pisani family
People who died at sea
Burials at Santi Giovanni e Paolo, Venice